Joan Elliott Pickart (d. November 13, 2018) was an American writer of over 100 romance novels, who also wrote under the pen name Robin Elliott.

Biography
Pickart was one of three daughters of Robert G. Elliott, an Episcopal pastor in Detroit, Michigan and Douglas, Arizona. She graduated from Douglas High School before attending Arizona State University. In 1982, she was employed as a secretary at Amphitheater High School, Tucson, Arizona, when she began writing romance novels after taking a course at Pima Community College. Her first published novel, Breaking All the Rules, was bought by Bantam Books in winter 1983-84 for their Loveswept range, and appeared in summer 1984. Pickart then became a full-time writer, with Bantam immediately buying six more of her novels. By late 1985, a reviewer wrote that Pickart was "fast becoming one of Loveswept's most consistent and popular authors [who] brings an extra dimension of humanity to the characters she creates ... [In Midnight Ryder she] employs humor and honest emotion to keep readers involved. ... Pickart's sensual writing is ... all the more romantic for being understated." In Waiting for Prince Charming, she used "many original touches [in] a modern rendering of an old fairy tale".

Elliott was the co-founder of the Professional Writers of Prescott, a member of the national Romance Writers of America, the Phoenix Desert Rose Chapter of RWA, and a charter member and co-president of the Northern Arizona RWA.

Elliott was a single mother of four daughters. She lived in Prescott, Arizona.

Awards
 1985: Best New Series Author of the Year from Romantic Times Magazine
 Outstanding Achievement and Certificate of Recognition for Notable Attainment as an Author from the Society of Southwestern Writers
 Two-time award finalist of Golden Medallion (RITA) of the Romance Writers of America

Bibliography

References

External links
 Joan Elliott Pickart's Webpage in Fantastic Fiction's Website
 Joan Elliott Pickart's Webpage in Harlequin Enterprises Ltd's Website

20th-century American novelists
21st-century American novelists
American romantic fiction writers
American women novelists
Living people
Year of birth missing (living people)
20th-century American women writers
21st-century American women writers